Deadly Decadence is an EP and the debut recording by the Norwegian heavy metal band Triosphere.

It was released in 2005 one year after the band's creation, and was followed up by their first full-length album, Onwards (which also includes tracks 2 and 3) a year later.

Track listing 

All music by Marius Silver Bergesen, all lyrics by Ida Haukland.

Personnel
 Triosphere
 Ida Haukland - lead vocals, bass
 Marius Silver Bergesen - lead and rhythm guitars
 Ørjan Aare Jørgensen - drums

 Production
 Rune Stavnesli - producing

References

External links 
 Official Triosphere website

2005 albums
Triosphere albums